Myristica alba is a species of plant in the family Myristicaceae. It is a tree endemic to the Maluku Islands of Indonesia.

References

alba
Endemic flora of the Maluku Islands
Trees of the Maluku Islands
Vulnerable plants
Taxonomy articles created by Polbot